LTO may refer to:

Science and technology
 Linear Tape-Open, a computer storage magnetic tape format
 Link-time optimization, a technique used by compilers to optimize software
 Low Temperature Oxide, a form of silicon dioxide used in microfabrication
 Lunar transfer orbit, in orbital mechanics
 Lithium titanate (Li2TiO3), a compound containing lithium and titanium
 Lithium-titanate battery, a type of rechargeable battery using a lithium-titanate anode

Other uses
 Lambda Tau Omega, an American college sorority
 Land Transportation Office (Philippines), a government agency in the Philippines
 Light tight oil, a type of crude oil
 Loreto International Airport (IATA code), Mexico
 Limited time only, a type of sales promotion